Deputy Andrew Green, MBE is a Jersey politician, and a member of the States of Jersey.

Political career
In 2011, Green was elected as Housing Minister, beating Deputy Geoff Southern by 36 votes to 15.
In 2014, Green was nominated and elected as Health Minister
He stood down from the States in the General Election of May 2018.

Voluntary work
Green is an unpaid chairman of the charity organisation Headway UK, and the Scott Gibaut Homes Trust, and he serves on the executive committee of the Jersey Scout Association.

References

External links

Living people
Deputies of Jersey
Government ministers of Jersey
Year of birth missing (living people)